Kavastu is a village in Luunja Parish, Tartu County, on the left bank of Emajõgi.

The only operating cable ferry in Estonia crosses the river at Kavastu.
At Kavastu, there is a mediumwave transmitter with 2 249 metres tall guyed masts, actually used for broadcasting a religious program on 1035 kHz with 125 kW.

Historically, the village is named as Alevi and Uue-Kastre.

Gallery

References

Population of Luunja Parish by villages

Villages in Tartu County
Kreis Dorpat